Rasmus Bille Bahncke is a Danish songwriter, record producer and keyboardist. He is a founding member of production team Supaflyas and part of New York-based studio This Is Care Of.

As a songwriter and producer he has worked for Backstreet Boys, CeCe Winans, Sting, Blue, Miley Cyrus, Aura Dione, Fagget Fairys and Hessismore.

Notable Prize achievements: 48th Grammy Awards - Certificate of Recognition presented to Supaflyas achieved for production work on Grammy Award winning song "Pray"  by US recording artist Cece Winans

Discography

Discography Source

References

1973 births
Living people
Musicians from Copenhagen
Danish musicians
Danish record producers
Danish songwriters
20th-century Danish musicians
21st-century Danish musicians